Tarania Caresh Clarke (3 October 1999 – 31 October 2019) was a Jamaican footballer who played as a midfielder for Waterhouse F.C. and the Jamaica women's national team. She also represented Jamaica on the under-17 and under-20 national teams.

On 31 October 2019, Clarke was stabbed to death in the Jamaican capital of Kingston, after a dispute over a mobile phone. A woman was arrested for her murder.

Early life and education
Clarke graduated from Excelsior High School where she captained the soccer team for three years. She planned to attend Daytona State College in Florida.

International career
Clarke represented Jamaica at the 2014 CONCACAF Girls' U-15 Championship, the 2016 CONCACAF Women's U-17 Championship qualification and the 2016 CONCACAF Women's U-17 Championship. She made her senior debut for Jamaica on 30 September 2019.

International goals
Scores and results list Jamaica's goal tally first

Death
On 31 October 2019, Clarke was stabbed to death in the Jamaican capital of Kingston, after a dispute over a mobile phone. A woman was arrested for her murder.

References

External links
 
 Jamaica player profile

1999 births
2019 deaths
Place of birth missing
Deaths by stabbing in Jamaica
Footballers at the 2019 Pan American Games
Jamaican women's footballers
Jamaica women's international footballers
Jamaican murder victims
Pan American Games competitors for Jamaica
Women's association football midfielders